The Beverley Building Society was founded in 1866 and is based in the East Riding of Yorkshire town of Beverley. Its only branch is in Beverley but from 1998 to 2009 it had a second branch in Pocklington. It is the 39th largest in the United Kingdom based on total assets of £174 million as at 31 December 2011. It is a member of the Building Societies Association and is the only independent building society in the East Riding of Yorkshire.  
The building society offers a range of savings accounts and one mortgage package with three levels of discount. The Beverley Building Society was awarded the nationally prestigious ‘Best Local Building Society’ award for 2016 by the Mortgage Finance Gazette publication.

References

External links
Beverley Building Society
Building Societies Association

Beverley
Building societies of England
Banks established in 1866
Organizations established in 1866
Organisations based in the East Riding of Yorkshire
1866 establishments in England